Neorhynchocephalus volaticus, the tangle-vein fly, is a species of tangle-veined fly in the family Nemestrinidae.

References

Nemestrinoidea
Articles created by Qbugbot
Insects described in 1883